Pocahontas is a city in and the county seat of Pocahontas County, Iowa, United States. The population was 1,867 in the 2020 census, a decline from the 1,970 population in 2000.

History
Pocahontas was first settled and surveyed in 1870 by Warrick and Buelah Price of Cleveland, Ohio. The city was named after Pocahontas, a Powhatan woman from Jamestown, Virginia. Other geographical names in the county related to the colony at Jamestown are Rolfe, Powhatan Township and Varina.

Pocahontas was incorporated as a city on May 16, 1892.

April 9, 2011 tornado
During the tornado outbreak of April 9–11, 2011, several tornadoes hit Pocahontas County and the surrounding area. No one was injured and there were no fatalities. The largest was an EF4 and touched down west of town.

Geography
Pocahontas's longitude and latitude coordinates in decimal form are 42.734476, -94.673017.

Pocahontas lies at the northwestern margin (rim) of Manson crater, an impact structure buried by glacial till and outwash.

Climate

According to the Köppen Climate Classification system, Pocahontas has a hot-summer humid continental climate, abbreviated "Dfa" on climate maps.

Demographics

2010 census
As of the census of 2010, there were 1,789 people, 852 households, and 493 families residing in the city. The racial makeup of the city was 98.3% White, 0.3% African American, 0.1% Native American, 0.1% Asian, 0.1% Pacific Islander, 0.1% from other races, and 1.0% from two or more races. Hispanic or Latino of any race were 1.3% of the population.

There were 852 households, of which 21.6% had children under the age of 18 living with them, 48.0% were married couples living together, 7.2% had a female householder with no husband present, 2.7% had a male householder with no wife present, and 42.1% were non-families. 39.1% of all households were made up of individuals, and 22.4% had someone living alone who was 65 years of age or older. The average household size was 2.04 and the average family size was 2.70.

The median age in the city was 51.1 years. 19.2% of residents were under the age of 18; 5.5% were between the ages of 18 and 24; 16.6% were from 25 to 44; 29.5% were from 45 to 64; and 29.2% were 65 years of age or older. The gender makeup of the city was 46.6% male and 53.4% female.

2000 census
As of the census of 2000, there were 1,970 people, 883 households, and 549 families residing in the city. The racial makeup of the city was 98.68% White, 0.25% African American, 0.15% Native American, 0.10% Asian, 0.20% from other races, and 0.61% from two or more races. Hispanic or Latino of any race were 0.51% of the population.

There were 883 households, out of which 25.8% had children under the age of 18 living with them, 53.3% were married couples living together, 7.1% had a female householder with no husband present, and 37.8% were non-families. 36.1% of all households were made up of individuals, and 24.0% had someone living alone who was 65 years of age or older. The average household size was 2.16 and the average family size was 2.79.

Age spread: 23.1% under the age of 18, 4.8% from 18 to 24, 22.1% from 25 to 44, 25.3% from 45 to 64, and 24.7% who were 65 years of age or older. The median age was 45 years. For every 100 females, there were 84.6 males. For every 100 females age 18 and over, there were 79.1 males.

The median income for a household in the city was $30,865, and the median income for a family was $42,690. Males had a median income of $29,806 versus $19,886 for females. The per capita income for the city was $17,556. About 6.7% of families and 9.1% of the population were below the poverty line, including 12.9% of those under age 18 and 5.9% of those age 65 or over.

Infrastructure

Transportation
In 1900, a railroad came to Pocahontas. Air transportation for the town is provided by Pocahontas Municipal Airport (FAA Identifier POH), located approximately one mile northeast of the city. The airport has two runways, the first is designated 11/29, with a concrete surface 4100 x 60 ft (1250 x 18 m) and runway edge lights, the second is designated 18/36 with a turf surface 1998 x 135 ft (609 x 41 m) and is unlighted.

Education
Pocahontas Area Community School District operates public schools.

Notable people 

 Larry Biittner (1946-2022), former Major League Baseball player
 Peg Mullen (1917–2009), anti-war activist and writer
 James V. Schall (1928–2019) Jesuit priest, professor of Government at Georgetown University, and prolific Roman Catholic writer
Alaskan serial killer and baker, Robert Hansen, grew up here, where his parents owned the Pocahontas Home Bakery.

See also

Saints Peter and Paul Catholic Church, listed on the National Register of Historic Places in Iowa

References

External links
 
 Pocahontas portal style website City government, Businesses, Economic Development
 City Data Comprehensive Statistical Data and more about Pocahontas

Cities in Pocahontas County, Iowa
Cities in Iowa
County seats in Iowa